This article displays the squads that participated at the football tournament at the 2011 Pan American Games in Guadalajara.

Group A

Chile

Yanara Aedo, FW
Yorky Arriagada, MF
Natalia Campos, GK
Nicole Cornejo, DF
Claudia Endler, GK
Daniela Fuenzalida, MF

Su Helen Galaz, DF
Javiera Guajardo, DF
Carla Guerrero, DF
Yessenia Huenteo
Francisca Lara, MF
Francisca Mardones, MF

Adriana Moya, MF
Tatiana Perez, DF
Maria Rojas, FW
Camila Sáez, DF
Rocio Soto, DF
Daniela Zamora, FW

Colombia

Lady Andrade, MF
Carolina Arias, DF
Katherine Arias, FW
Katerin Castro, FW
Julieth Dominguez, DF
Angélica Hernández, DF

Fatima Montaño, DF
Daniela Montoya, MF
Diana Ospina, MF
Kelis Peduzine, DF
Catalina Perez, GK
Hazleydi Rincon, MF

Carmen Rodallega, DF
Kena Romero, FW
Jessica Sánchez, MF
Gavy Santos, DF
Sandra Sepúlveda, GK
Catalina Usme, MF

Mexico
Head coach:  Roberto Medina

Trinidad and Tobago

Kimika Forbes, GK
Shalette Alexander, GK
Karyn Forbes, DF
Tiana Bateau, DF
Arin King, DF
Danielle Blair, DF

Maylee Attin-Johnson, FW
Anastacia Prescott, DF
Victoria Swift, MF
Candace Edwards, MF
Kennya Cordner, FW
Lauryn Hutchinson, FW

Rhea Belgrave, DF
Tasha St. Louis, MF
Nadia James, DF
Ahkeela Mollon, FW
Dernelle Mascall, MF
Janine François, MF

Group B

Argentina

Analía Almeida MF
Gabriela Barrios DF 
Agustina Barroso DF
Maria Gimena Blanco MF
Gabriela Chávez MF/DF
Noelia Espíndola DF

Marisa Farina DF
Delfina Fernández
Emilia Mendieta FW
Elisabeth Minnig GK
Andrea Ojeda FW
Laurina Oliveros GK

Mercedes Pereyra MF/FW
Belén Potassa FW
María Florencia Quiñones DF/MF
Betina Fernanda Soriano MF/FW 
Amancay Urbani MF/FW
Fabiana Vallejos MF

Brazil

Francielle Alberto
Rosana Augusto
Barbara Barbosa
Daniele Batista
Renata Costa
Debora De Oliveira

Maurine Goncalves
Thais Guedes
Beatriz Joao
Miraildes Mota
Grazielle Nascimento
Tania Pereira

Thais Picarte
Karen Rocha
Daiane Rodrigues
Andreia Santos
Renata Santos
Ketlen Wiggers

Canada
Head coach:  John Herdman

Costa Rica

Wendy Acosta, FW
Katherine Alvarado, MF
Julieth Arias, GK
Yirlania Arroyo, GK
Mariela Campos, MF
Daniela Cruz, DF

Shirley Cruz, MF
Karolina Durán, FW
María Gamboa, MF
Hazel Quirós, DF
Lixy Rodríguez, DF
Raquel Rodríguez, MF

Saudy Rosales, FW
Diana Sáenz, DF
Carol Sánchez, DF
Marianne Ugalde, DF
Carolina Venegas, FW
Yendry Villalobos, MF

References

External links
Official website

Team squads at the 2011 Pan American Games
Football at the 2011 Pan American Games
Pan American Games women's football squads
2011 in women's association football